Senegal's environmental issues are varied. According to the CIA world factbook pressing problems exist with: diminishing wildlife populations which are threatened by poaching, deforestation, overgrazing, soil erosion, desertification, and overfishing.

Climate change

Deforestation and land degradation 
Like other parts of West Africa and the developing world, social forces and policies are leading to  deforestation and ecosystem degradation, leading to effects like Desertification and social erosion. Charcoal production,  alongside pressure to expand agriculture in Senegal to meet the quadrupling of population has led to increased loss of forest.

In 2006, Senegal still had 45.1%  —or about 8,673,000 hectares—of forest with 18.4% — or roughly 1,598,000 hectares — classified as primary forest. In 2007 Senegal was losing 350,000 hectares of forest per year through slash-and-burn for farming because of its rapidly growing population.  Variability of rainfall compounded with issues like climate change, lead About 13% of the land - holding about 22% of the population - are now considered degraded. Senegal had a 2018 Forest Landscape Integrity Index mean score of 7.11/10, ranking it 56th globally out of 172 countries.

In 2016, the government warned that the Casamance forest cover would have vanished by 2018, if illegal logging continued.

Mitigation 
Since 1970s Senegal has lost 25% of its mangrove forests. Recent efforts have been led by the organization Oceanium to replant the mangroves.

The national Forest Service designed in the early 2000s was designed to democratize and decentralize forest management. However, subsequent analysis by academics found that inequalities favor commercial interests and exploitation by economic forces.

Overfishing 

West African communities face pressure from both overfishing by local fleets as well as Asian and European fleets harvesting from fisheries in West Africa as other fisheries become overfished or collapse. For example fleets in 2017 Saint-Louis, Senegal have seen a large decline in harvest, causing ripple effects on nutrition and food supply in the country, where 75% of animal protein comes from fish.

See also
Geography of Senegal
Agriculture in Senegal
Water supply and sanitation in Senegal
Ecological Monitoring Centre, Senegal
Rally of the Ecologists of Senegal
List of mammals of Senegal
List of non-marine molluscs of Senegal
Basse Casamance National Park

External links

References